Shag Rock may refer to the following places:

 Shag Rock (Antarctica)
 Shag Rock (California), United States
 Rapanui Rock, also called "Shag Rock", located in New Zealand
 Shag Rock (Houtman Abrolhos), Australia

See also
 Shag Rock (band), Australian band formed in 2011
 Shag Rocks (disambiguation)
 Shag Reef, Tasmania, Australia